Song Moo Kwan, also named "Song Moo Kwan Kong Soo Do ", is one of the Five original kwans (martial art schools) of taekwondo in Korea. Its founder, from 1944, Supreme Grandmaster Byung Jik Ro (1919–2015), was one of the highest ranking taekwondo practitioners in the world, and is considered the "Founder of Modern Taekwondo". The techniques of what is commonly known as Song Moo Kwan combine elements of Shotokan Karate Do and Korean taekwondo kicking.

See also 
 Korean martial arts
 Taekwondo
 Tang Soo Do

References 

Sources
A Modern History of Taekwondo, 1999 (Korean), Kyong Myung Lee and Kang Won Sik, .
Global Taekwondo, 2003 (English), Kyo Yoon Lee, .
A Guide to Taekwondo, 1996 (English), Kyo Yoon Lee, .
Kukkiwon 25th Anniversary Text, 1997 (Korean), Un Yong Kim.
Kukkiwon Textbook 2006 (English/Korean), Um Woon Kyu.

External links 
 Song Moo Kwan Taekwondo Homepage
 World Martial Arts Center, Song Moo Kwan US Headquarters
 American Song Moo Kwan Association
 Korean Taekwondo Association
 The Kukkiwon - World Taekwondo Headquarters
 The World Taekwondo Federation
 Taekwondo Hall of Fame
 European Song Moo Kwan Association
 Song Moo Kwan International Dan Search
  TDK2

Taekwondo kwans